Adak Region School District was a school district formerly in operation in Adak, Alaska.

History
The district's sole school was the K-12 Adak Naval Station School, which had 37 teachers and 551 students circa October 1978.

Ed Gilley was the final superintendent of the district; he was hired for the position in 1989. Circa 1994 the final student left the Adak district as the Adak Naval Air Station closed. The students left the district when the U.S. Navy removed children and spouses from the air station. The district itself closed in June 1996, due to a ruling from a state court.

From 1994 to 1996 Gilley remained as the superintendent as he was distributing district assets. Gilley became the superintendent of the Kashunamiut School District after the dissolution of the Adak district. The state of Alaska sought to revoke Gilley's certificate for being a school administrator, accusing him of improperly billing the district, taking district-funded trips, and unfairly reporting a higher income than he actually had to the Alaska teacher retirement system. In 1998 Gilley did not admit to wrongdoing but agreed to voluntarily give up his license.

Adak School is currently operated by the Aleutian Region School District.

References

Further reading
  (Opinion)

External links
 "ERIC ED190517: Adak Region Schools Secondary Curriculum Guide, Grades 7-12." July 1977. From ERIC - Available at archive.org

School districts in Alaska
1996 disestablishments in Alaska
Educational institutions disestablished in 1996
Education in Unorganized Borough, Alaska
Aleutians West Census Area, Alaska
Adak, Alaska